Susanne Ljungskog (born 16 March 1976 in Halmstad) is a Swedish former cyclist. As a four-time Olympian (1996, 2000, 2004 and 2008), she won the world road race championship in 2002 and 2003. The same years, she was UCI points champion. She has also won two World Cup races.

Ljungskog received the Svenska Dagbladet Gold Medal in 2002.

Career highlights

1994
1st  National Road Race Championships
2nd Drei Tagen von Pattensen
3rd Overall Thüringen Rundfahrt der Frauen
3rd GP Scandinavia Time Trial
3rd Tjejtrampet – 3rd place

1996
National Road Championships
1st  Road Race
2nd Time Trial

1997
National Road Championships
1st  Road Race
3rd Time Trial
4th European U23 Road Race Championships

1998
National Road Championships
1st  Road Race
2nd Time Trial
European U23 Road Championships
1st  Road Race
1st Tjejtrampet
2nd Overall Thüringen Rundfahrt der Frauen
1st Stage 1 
2nd Overall Eurosport Tour of Poland
 2 stage wins
5th Overall Tour de l'Aude Cycliste Féminin
1st Stage 1

1999
3rd Overall Holland Ladies Tour

2000
2nd Luba Classic
3rd Overall Holland Ladies Tour
3rd Overall Vuelta International a Majorca
1st Stage 1
5th Tjejtrampet

2001
1st GP Suisse Féminin
1st Primavera Rosa
2nd Montréal
3rd Overall Tour de l'Aude Cycliste Féminin
6th Overall
1st Stage 1 Grande Boucle

2002
1st  UCI Road World Championships Road Race
1st  Overall Giro della Toscana
3 stage wins
1st UCI Road World Cup Points Championship
 2nd Overall Grande Boucle
1st Stage 1
 2nd Overall Trophée Féminin Méditerranéen
1st Stage 1
3rd Overall Tour de Snowy
3rd GP de Plouay (World Cup)
4th Overall Emakumeen Bira
1st  Points classification
1st Stage 1

2003
1st  UCI Road World Championships Road Race
1st  Overall Giro della Toscana
1st  Overall Holland Ladies Tour
1st UCI Road World Cup Points Championship
2nd Overall 
1st Stage 1 Thüringen Rundfahrt der Frauen
2nd Overall Giro del Trentino
3rd Overall Tour de l'Aude Cycliste Féminin
1st Stage 1
3rd Overall Vuelta a Castilla y León
3rd Rotterdam Tour

2004
1st  National Road Race Championships
1st Stage 1 Thüringen Rundfahrt der Frauen
5th Overall Giro del Trentino
9th Overall Tour de l'Aude Cycliste Féminin
1st Stage 1

2005
1st  National Road Race Championships
1st  Overall Giro della Toscana
1st Stage 1
1st Castilla y Leon
2nd Overall Holland Ladies Tour
2 stage wins
2nd Overall Thüringen Rundfahrt der Frauen
2nd Overall Gracia–Orlová
1st Stage 1
2nd Overall Geelong Tour
2nd UCI Road World Cup Points Championship
2nd GP Wales
2nd Ronde van Vlaaneren
6th Overall Emakumeen Bira
1st Stage 1

2006
National Road Championships
1st  Road Race
1st  Time Trial
1st  Overall Holland Ladies Tour
1st Open de Suède Vårgårda
2nd Overall Tour de l'Aude Cycliste Féminin
3rd Overall Giro d'Italia Femminile

2007
1st  Overall Tour de l'Aude Cycliste Féminin
1st  Overall Emakumeen Bira
1st Stage 1

2008
1st  Overall Tour de l'Aude Cycliste Féminin
1st Stage 4

References

External links
Susanne Ljungskog's web site
Susanne Ljungskog's team

1976 births
Living people
Swedish female cyclists
Olympic cyclists of Sweden
UCI Road World Champions (women)
Cyclists at the 1996 Summer Olympics
Cyclists at the 2000 Summer Olympics
Cyclists at the 2004 Summer Olympics
Cyclists at the 2008 Summer Olympics
Sportspeople from Halmstad
Sportspeople from Halland County
20th-century Swedish women
21st-century Swedish women